The 1997 Speedway Grand Prix was the 52nd edition of the official World Championship. It was the third season in the Speedway Grand Prix era used to determine the Speedway World Champion.

Greg Hancock from the United States became the World Champion with 118 points beating fellow American Billy Hamill into second place. The bronze medal went to Pole Tomasz Gollob.

Event format 
During 1997 the initial SGP scoring system was used for the final time.  Each rider raced every other in the meeting with the top 4 qualifying for a final - the points for all other riders determined their finishing position in the meeting and therefore their championship Grand Prix points. The 4 finalists scored 25, 20, 18 and 16 points, with the reminder scoring 14, 13, 12, 11, 9, 8, 7, 6, 4, 3, 2, 1.

Qualification for Grand Prix 

The 1997 season had 17 permanent riders and one wild card at each event.  The permanent riders are highlighted in the results table below.

Calendar

Final standings

See also 
 motorcycle speedway

References

External links 
 Official Speedway GP site

 
1997
World I